Jacinto Sabinal (born 12 August 1942) is a Mexican long-distance runner. He competed in the marathon at the 1972 Summer Olympics.

References

1942 births
Living people
Athletes (track and field) at the 1972 Summer Olympics
Mexican male long-distance runners
Mexican male marathon runners
Olympic athletes of Mexico
Place of birth missing (living people)
20th-century Mexican people